In molecular biology, U14 small nucleolar RNA (U14 snoRNA) is a non-coding RNA required for early cleavages of eukaryotic precursor rRNAs. In yeasts, this molecule possess a stem-loop region (known as the Y-domain) which is essential for function. A similar structure, but with a different consensus sequence, is found in plants, but is absent in vertebrates. In human there are two closely related copies called SNORD14A and SNORD14B that are expressed from the intron of their host gene ribosomal protein Rps13.

References

External links 
 
 
 Entry for SNORD14A in HGNC database
 
 Entry for SNORD14B in HGNC database

Small nuclear RNA